Bence House (Serbian: Бенцеова кућа) is a palace in Zrenjanin, Serbia. It was built in 1909 in the style of Vienna secession.

History 
The palace was projected as a modern department store. The owner of the palace was Miksa Bence, owner of the local furniture factory (established in 1861). He wanted to have a huge, modern showroom for his products. Building has large shop-windows, which shows that it was a trade object.

Bence's house represents the first modernly designed building in the King Alexander I Street, main pedestrian street in Zrenjanin.

Today 
After a hundred years, Bence House is still a furniture shop.

Zrenjanin
Buildings and structures in Vojvodina
Houses completed in 1909
1909 establishments in Serbia
Art Nouveau architecture in Serbia
Art Nouveau houses